Rhizidiovirus is a genus of viruses. Stramenopiles (fungi and hyphochytridiomycota) serve as natural hosts. There is only one species in this genus: Rhizidiomyces virus.

Structure

Viruses in Rhizidiovirus are non-enveloped, with icosahedral, round, and  isometric geometries. The diameter is around 60 nm.

The genome is non segmented, linear double stranded DNA and ~25.5 kilobases in length. It has a guanine + cytosine content of 42%. It encodes at least 14 protein with molecular weights between 84.5 and 26 kiloDaltons.

Life cycle
The virus seems to remain latent within the host until the host is stressed. Virons first appear in the nucleus. This is followed by the disintegration of the host nucleus and cytoplasm and their replacement by paracrystalline structures composed of virons. These structures first appear in association with the mitochondria. After the nucleus and cytoplasm have been replaced the cell wall breaks down followed with release of virons into the medium. Vertical transmission also appears to be possible.

DNA-templated transcription is the method of transcription. Fungi and hyphochytridiomycota serve as the natural host.

References

External links
 Viralzone: Rhizidiovirus
 ICTV

Double-stranded DNA viruses
Virus genera